The Men's 73 kg competition at the 2019 World Judo Championships was held on 27 August 2019.

Results

Finals

Repechage

Pool A
Preliminary round

Pool B
Preliminary round

Pool C
Preliminary round

Pool D
Preliminary round

Prize money
The sums listed bring the total prizes awarded to 57,000$ for the individual event.

References

External links
 
 Draw

M73
World Judo Championships Men's Lightweight